South 65 (also spelled South Sixty-Five) was an American country music boy band. The group was composed of vocalists Lance Leslie, Brent Parker, Stephen Parker, Jerimy Koeltzow, and Doug Urie. Between 1997 and its disbanding in 2001, South 65 charted five singles on the Billboard Hot Country Songs charts, in addition to recording two albums on Atlantic Records. In 2006, former vocalist Lance Leslie founded another group called Rio Grand.

Biography
Delious Kennedy, a member of the R&B group All-4-One, wanted to form a boy band for country music. He first picked brothers Brenton and Stephen Parker, and later held a nationwide talent search to find the other three members. All five members were in place by 1997. Delious and Anthony L. Smith produced the band's 1998 self-titled debut album, which reached a peak of No. 70 on the Billboard Top Country Albums charts. Its singles included "A Random Act of Senseless Kindness", "No Easy Goodbye", and "Baby's Got My Number", which respectively reached No. 55, No. 56 and No. 60 on the Hot Country Singles & Tracks (now Hot Country Songs) charts. In 2000, the band released "Love Bug (Bite Me)", which reached No. 72 on that chart and never appeared on an album.

South 65 released its second and final album for Atlantic Nashville in 2001. Titled Dream Large, the album went to No. 63 on the country albums charts. Bobby Huff produced three tracks, and Buddy Cannon and Norro Wilson produced the other seven. This album included a cover of Charlie Rich's 1973 Number One hit "The Most Beautiful Girl", which South 65 took to No. 54 on the country charts. After the album's release, the members of South 65 parted ways due to the closure of Atlantic Records' Nashville division. Urie began a solo career, while Leslie joined Rio Grand, which he has since left.

Critical reception
Charlotte Dillon of Allmusic gave four stars out of five to both of the band's albums. She said that the first album did not have a distinctively country music sound, but called the group "revitalizing" and said that the first album's songs were "mostly done in sweet harmonies sure to set young female hearts to fluttering." She said of the second album that it had a more country sound with some R&B influences. An uncredited review in Billboard gave a negative review, saying that the members had "anonymous, pretty voices" and that the songs "are not very convincing country." Jennifer Webb of About.com gave Dream Large a favorable review, saying, "South 65 amazes me with their harmonizing and vocal abilities."

South Sixty-Five (1998)

Track listing
"Baby's Got My Number" (Roger Cook, Anthony L. Smith) – 3:00
"Climbing Up Mt. Everest" (Tommy Lee James, Robin Lerner) – 3:03
"I'm There" (Kelly Shiver, Jon Vezner) – 4:12
"Uncle Hickory's General Store" (Stephanie C. Brown, Larry Wayne Clark) – 3:16
"One of the Precious Few" (Walt Aldridge, Bob DiPiero) – 3:40
"All of This and More" (Jim Photoglo, Smith) – 3:54
"No Easy Goodbye" (Jerry Holland) – 4:07
"Love Will Last" (Michael Dulaney, Tim Norton) – 3:13
"To Me" (James, Roberta Schiller) – 4:07
"A Random Act of Senseless Kindness" (Gary Baker, Frank J. Myers, Jerry Williams) – 3:57

Musicians
As listed on Allmusic.
Bruce Bouton – steel guitar
Mike Brignardello – bass guitar
Dennis Burnside – piano
Mike Chapman – bass guitar
Tabitha Fair – background vocals
Owen Hale – drums
Chris Leuzinger – electric guitar
Greg Morrow – drums
Steve Nathan – synthesizer
Danny Parks – acoustic guitar
Barry Walsh – piano
Biff Watson – acoustic guitar
John Willis – acoustic guitar
Curtis Young – background vocals

Dream Large (2001)

Track listing
"The Most Beautiful Girl (2001 version)" (Billy Sherrill, Norro Wilson, Rory Michael Bourke) – 3:29
"Like an Angel" (David Leone, Pat Buchanan) – 3:34
"I Swear to You" (Bobby Huff) – 3:26
"Only Perfect" (Mark McGuinn, Trey Matthews) – 3:13
"All I Ever Did" (Neal Coty, Randy VanWarmer) – 3:39
"The Great Love of 1998" (Bob DiPiero, Craig Wiseman, Tim Nichols) – 3:30
"One Moment" (Chris Waters, Wes Hightower) – 3:37
"Gettin' the Feelin'" (Huff) – 3:33
"Even If" (Liz Hengber, Tommy Lee James) – 3:07
"Dream Large" (Danny Mayo) – 3:32

Musicians
As listed in liner notes.
David Angel – strings
Eddie Bayers – drums
Larry Beaird – acoustic guitar
David Briggs – piano
Arbry Burcon – banjo
David Davidson – strings
Dan Dugmore – steel guitar
Larry Franklin – fiddle
Paul Franklin – steel guitar
Rob Hajacos – fiddle
John Hobbs – Hammond B-3 organ
Bobby Huff – acoustic guitar, keyboards, drums, percussion
John Jorgenson – electric guitar
Paul Leim – drums
B. James Lowry – acoustic guitar
Randy McCormick – piano, keyboards, Hammond B-3 organ
Terry McMillan – harmonica
Dale Oliver – electric guitar
Danny Parks – acoustic guitar
Larry Paxton – bass guitar
Buck Reid – steel guitar
Randy Threet – bass guitar
Jason West – bass guitar
John Willis – electric guitar
Bob Wray – bass guitar

Discography

Albums

Singles

Music videos

References

Country music groups from Tennessee
American boy bands
Atlantic Records artists
Vocal quintets
Musical groups established in 1997
Musical groups disestablished in 2001